Parliamentary elections were held in Uruguay on 29 November 1931. The various factions of the Colorado Party won the most seats in the Chamber of Deputies.

Results

References

Elections in Uruguay
Uruguay
Parliamentary
Uruguay
Election and referendum articles with incomplete results